The following is a timeline of the history of the city of Isfahan, Iran.

Prior to 16th century

c. 538 BC - Jews settle in Isfahan
 771 - Friday Mosque established in Yahudiyya (approximate date).
 1051 - Isfahan besieged by Seljuk forces of Tughril; city becomes capital of the Seljuk Empire.
 1070 - Nezamiyeh Madrasa built (approximate date).
 1107 - Chihil Dukhtaran (minaret) erected.
 1194 - Khwarazmian Ala ad-Din Tekish in power.
 1226 - City sacked by Mongol forces.
 1228 - City besieged by Mongol forces again.
 1240/1241 - Isfahan taken by Mongol forces.
 1325 - Emamzadeh Jafar (tomb/shrine) built.
 1341/1342 - Shaikh Abu Esḥāq Inju becomes governor of Isfahan.
 1356 - Amir Mobārez-al-Din Mo-ḥammad Moẓaffari becomes governor of Isfahan.
 1387 - Isfahan besieged by forces of Timur.

16th-19th centuries
 1503 - Safavid Ismail I in power.
 1598 - Isfahan becomes capital of the Safavid Empire; Abbas I of Persia in power.
 1602
 Si-o-seh pol (bridge) built to newly developed New Julfa.
 Maydān-i shāh (square) laid out.
 1619 - Sheikh Lotfollah Mosque built.
 1627 - Armenian Bedkhem Church built in New Julfa.
 1630 - Shah Mosque built (approximate date).
 1647 - Chehel Sotoun palace construction begins.
 1650 - Khaju Bridge built.
 1660 - Ālī Qāpū (palace) built (approximate date).
 1670 - Hasht Behesht palace built.
 1722 - Siege of Isfahan by Afghan forces.
 1736 - Persian capital relocated from Isfahan to Mashhad.
 1804/1805 - Famine.
 1836/1837 - Unrest.
 1848/1849 - Unrest.
 1869 - Isfahan economy affected by opening of the Suez Canal in Egypt.
 1872 - Famine.
 1874 - Mass'oud Mirza Zell-e Soltan becomes governor of Isfahan.
 1882 - Population: 73,634.

20th century

 1919 - Zaban-e Zanan women's magazine begins publication.
 1920 - Population: 80,000 (approximate estimate).
 1921 - Waṭan textile factory in business.
 1941 - Population: 204,598.
 1946 - University of Isfahan established.
 1953 - Sepahan F.C. (football club) formed.
 1959 - Hamadāniān cement factory in business.
 1966 - Population: 424,045.
 1970s - Polyacryl Iran Corporation established.(en)
 1971 - Āryāmehr steel mill begins operating near city.
 1973 - Naqsh-e jahan derby (football contest) begins.
 1976 - Population: 661,510.
 1977 - Ālī Qāpū, Chehel Sotoun, and Hasht Behesht palaces restored.
 1977 - Isfahan University of Technology established.
 1979 - Naqsh-e Jahan Square designated an UNESCO World Heritage Site.
 1983 -  becomes mayor.(fa)
 1984 - Isfahan International Airport opens.
 1986 - Population: 986,753.
 1996 - Population: 1,266,072.
 1999 - February: Local election held.

21st century

 2003
 Naghsh-e Jahan Stadium opens.
  becomes mayor.(fa)
 2011 - Population: 1,756,126.
 2013 - 14 June: Local election held.
 2014 - City becomes part of newly formed national administrative Region 2.
 2015
 Isfahan Metro begins operating.
 Mehdi Jamalinejad becomes mayor of Isfahan.

See also

 Isfahan history (fr)
 Other names of Isfahan
 List of mayors of Isfahan (fa)
 List of historical structures in Isfahan Province
 Timelines of other cities in Iran: Bandar Abbas, Hamadan, Kerman, Mashhad, Qom, Shiraz, Tabriz, Tehran, Yazd

References

This article incorporates information from the Persian Wikipedia and German Wikipedia.

Bibliography

in English

Published prior to 19th century
 

Published in the 20th century
 
 
 
  
  
 
 
 
 
 Eckart Ehlers. "Capitals and spatial organization in Iran: Esfahân, Shirâz, Tehran," in Chahryar Adle and Bernard Hourcade, eds., Téhéran: Capitale bicentenaire, (Paris and Teheran: Institut Français de Recherche en Iran, 1992), pp. 155–172. 
 
 
 Stephen P. Blake. Half the World: A Social Architecture of Safavid Isfahan, 1590-1722 (Costa Mesa, Cal.: Mazda, 1999)
  + part 2, 2001
Published in the 21st century
 
 
 
 
 
 Sussan Babaie. Isfahan and Its Palaces: Statecraft, Shiʿism, and the Architecture of Conviviality in Early Modern Iran. Edinburgh: Edinburgh University Press, 2008

in other languages
  (Biographical dictionary written in 10th century CE)
  (Written in 11th century CE)
  (Biographical dictionary written in 11th century CE)
 
 
 
  circa 1920s?
 
 
 H. Gaube and E. Wirth. Der Bazar von Isfahan, Tübinger Atlas des Vorderen Orients, Beihefte B/22, Wiesbaden, 1978.
 
  (Special issue on Isfahan)

External links

  (Includes multiple articles)
  (Bibliography)
 Items related to Isfahan, various dates (via Qatar Digital Library)
 Items related to Isfahan, various dates (via Europeana)
 Items related to Isfahan, various dates (via Digital Public Library of America)
 
 

Years in Iran
Isfahan
Isfahan
History of Isfahan Province